Lao names (Lao: ຊື່ ) are given in Western order, where the family name goes after the first given name. On official documents, both first given name and surname are written, but it is customary to refer to people in formal situations by their first name, plus titles and honorifics, alone. 

In daily life, outside of formal, international, or academic spheres, Lao people generally refer to themselves and others by nicknames, or seu lin—literally "playnames" (Lao: ຊື່ຫຼິ້ນ ). Much like the nicknames of Thai people (with whom the Lao share a great deal of cultural similarity), the names are often unflattering, although some are based on onomatopoeia, nonsense syllables, or peculiar characteristics. This is largely based on old superstitions from times when health care was not available and there was high infant mortality, as many of these names were supposed to ward off evil spirits from claiming the child.

The French Colonial government mandated the introduction of surnames in Laos in 1943, beginning first with the royalty and the élite before becoming a common practice among the other classes. To this day, among isolated ethnic groups and remote rural villages, it is still possible to find individuals who do not possess a surname.

Both first and surname are a mixture of Pali or Sanskrit and Lao words. The wording comes from variety of influences, such as nature, animals, and royal titles. Lao names are generally made up of two or three words, but when translated into English span nearly 10–15 letters, for which both Lao and Thai names are known.

Common name components

See also
 Indian honorifics
 Indosphere
 Greater India

References

Laotian culture
Names by culture